Ancient Aethiopia, (also known as Ethiopia) first appears as a geographical term in classical documents in reference to the upper Nile region of Sudan, as well as certain areas south of the Sahara. Its earliest mention is in the works of Homer: twice in the Iliad, and three times in the Odyssey. The Greek historian Herodotus "specifically" uses the appellation to refer to such parts of sub-Saharan Africa as were then known within the inhabitable world.

Etymology
The Greek name Aithiopia (from ) is a compound derived of two Greek words:  + . According to the Perseus Project, this designation properly translates  in noun form as burnt-face and in adjectival form as red-brown. As such, it was used as a vague term for dark-skinned populations since the time of Homer. The term was applied to such peoples when within the range of observation of the ancient geographers, primarily in what was then Nubia (in ancient Sudan). With the expansion of geographical knowledge, the exonym successively extended to certain other areas below the Sahara. In classical antiquity, the term Africa (or 'Ancient Libya') did not refer to any part of sub-Saharan Africa, but instead to what is now known as the Maghreb and all the desert land west of the southern Nile river.

Before Herodotus
Homer is the first to mention "Aethiopians", writing that they are to be found at the east and west extremities of the world, divided by the sea into "eastern" (at the sunrise) and "western" (at the sunset). In Book 1 of the Iliad, Thetis visits Olympus to meet Zeus, but the meeting is postponed, as Zeus and other gods are absent, visiting the land of the Aethiopians.

And in Book 1 of the Odyssey, Athena convinces Zeus to let Odysseus finally return home only because Poseidon is away in Aithiopia and unable to object.

Hesiod speaks of Memnon as the "king of the Ethiopians."

In 515 BC, Scylax of Caryanda, on orders from Darius I of the Achaemenid Empire, sailed along the Indus River, Indian Ocean, and Red Sea, circumnavigating the Arabian Peninsula. He mentioned "Aethiopians", though his writings on them have not survived.

Hecataeus of Miletus is also said to have written a book about 'Aethiopia,' but his writing is now known only through quotations from later authors. He stated that 'Aethiopia' was located to the east of the Nile, as far as the Red Sea and Indian Ocean. He is also quoted as relating a myth in which the Skiapods ('Shade feet'), whose feet were supposedly large enough to serve as shade, lived there.

In Herodotus
In his Histories, Herodotus presents some of the most ancient and detailed information about "Aethiopia". He relates that he personally traveled up the Nile to the border of Egypt as far as Elephantine (modern Aswan). In his view, "Aethiopia" is all of the inhabited land found to the south of Egypt, beginning at Elephantine. He describes a capital at Meroë, adding that the only deities worshipped there were Zeus (Amun) and Dionysus (Osiris). He relates that in the reign of Pharaoh Psamtik I, many Egyptian soldiers deserted their country and settled amidst the Aethiopians.

Herodotus also remarked on the shared cultural practices between Egyptians and Ethiopians as he states: “I myself guessed it to be so, partly because they are dark-skinned and woolly-haired; though that indeed goes for nothing, seeing that other peoples, too, are such; but my better proof was that the Colchians and Egyptians and Ethiopians are the only nations that have from the first practised circumcision”.

Herodotus further noted that there had been 18 Ethiopian kings and one queen among the Egyptian dynasties.  

Herodotus tells us that king Cambyses II of the Achaemenid Empire sent spies to the Aethiopians "who dwelt in that part of Libya (Africa) which borders upon the southern sea." They found a strong and healthy people. Although Cambyses then campaigned toward their country, by not preparing enough provisions for the long march, his army completely failed and returned quickly.

In Book 3, Herodotus defines "Aethiopia" as the farthest region of "Libya" (i.e. Africa):

Herodotus also wrote that the Ammonians of Siwa Oasis are "colonists from Egypt and Ethiopia and speak a language compounded of the tongues of both countries".

Other Greco-Roman historians and primary accounts
The Egyptian priest Manetho listed Kushite (25th) dynasty, calling it the "Aethiopian dynasty," and Esarhaddon the early 7th century BC ruler of the Neo-Assyrian Empire describes deporting all "Aethiopians" from Egypt upon conquering Egypt from the Nubian Kushite Empire which formed the 25th Dynasty. Moreover, when the Hebrew Bible was translated into Greek (c. 200 BC), the Hebrew appellation "Kush, Kushite" became in Greek "Aethiopia, Aethiopians", appearing as "Ethiopia, Ethiopians" in the English King James Version.

Agatharchides provides a relatively detailed description of the gold mining system of Aethiopia. His text was copied almost verbatim by virtually all subsequent ancient writers on the area, including Diodorus Siculus and Photius.

Diodorus Siculus reported that the Ethiopians claimed that Egypt was an early colony and that the Ethiopians also cited evidence that they were more ancient than the Egyptians as he wrote:  

Diodorus Siculus also discussed the similar cultural practices between the Ethiopians and Egyptians such as the writing systems as he states “We must now speak about the Ethiopian writing which is called hieroglyphic among the Egyptians, in order that we may omit nothing in our discussion of their antiquities”.

Strabo discussed migrations between Egypt and Ethiopia in his book, Geography, and noted that “Egyptians settled Ethiopia and Colchis”.
With regard to the Ethiopians, Strabo indicates that they looked similar to Indians, remarking "those who are in Asia (South India), and those who are in Africa, do not differ from each other." Pliny in turn asserts that the place-name "Aethiopia" was derived from one "Aethiop, a son of Vulcan" (the Greek god Hephaestus). He also writes that the "Queen of the Ethiopians" bore the title Kandake, and avers (incorrectly) that the Ethiopians had conquered ancient Syria and the Mediterranean. Following Strabo, the Greco-Roman historian Eusebius claims that the Ethiopians had emigrated into the Red Sea area from the Indus Valley and that there were no people in the region by that name prior to their arrival.

Physiognomonics, a Greek treatise traditionally attributed to Aristotle, but now of disputed ownership  made an observation on the physical nature of the Egyptians and Ethiopians with the view that “Those who are too black are cowards, like for the instance, the Egyptians and Ethopians”

The Greek travelogue from the 1st-century AD, known as the Periplus of the Erythraean Sea, initially describes the littoral, based on its author's intimate knowledge of the area. However, the Periplus does not mention any dark-skinned "Ethiopians" among the area's inhabitants. They only later appear in Ptolemy's Geographia in a region far south, around the "Bantu nucleus" of northern Mozambique.

Arrian, wrote in the 1st-century AD that “The appearance of the inhabitants is also not very different in India and Ethiopia: the southern Indians are rather more like Ethiopians as they are black to look on, and their hair is black; only they are not so snub-nosed or woolly-haired as the Ethiopians; the northern Indians are most like the Egyptians physically”.

Also the Roman Christian historian and theologian Saint Jerome along with Sophronius referred to Colchis as the "second Ethiopia" because of its 'black-skinned' population.

Stephanus of Byzantium, from the 6th-century AD, had written that "Ethiopia was the first established country on earth; and the Ethiopians were the first to set up the worship of the gods and to establish laws."

In literature
Several personalities in Greek and medieval literature were identified as Aethiopian, including several rulers, male and female:

 Memnon and his brother, Emathion, King of Arabia. 
 Cepheus and Cassiopeia, parents of Andromeda, were named as king and queen of Aethiopia. 
 Homer in his description of the Trojan War mentions several other Aethiopians.

See also
 Aethiopian Sea
 Name of Ethiopia
 Ethiopian historiography
 History of Ethiopia
 Sigelwara Land
 White Aethiopians
 Black people in Ancient Roman history
 Nubia
 Land of Punt
 Curse of Ham
 Washing the Ethiopian White

Notes

References

Africa in Greek mythology
Ancient Greek geography of East Africa
Classical geography
Countries in ancient Africa
Greco-Roman ethnography
Historical regions
Legendary tribes in Greco-Roman historiography
Locations in the Iliad
Sub-Saharan Africa